"Doubt" is a song by American singer Mary J. Blige. It was written by Blige and English musician Sam Romans for her twelfth studio album The London Sessions (2014), while production was helmed by Romans and record producer Rodney "Darkchild" Jerkins. "Doubt" is a R&B ballad, with gospel influences. The song was released as the album's fourth and final single on March 9, 2015. "Doubt" peaked in the top ten on the US Adult R&B Songs.

Music video
The music video for "Doubt" was directed by Ethan Lader and released on March 11, 2015.

Credits and personnel 
Credits adapted from The London Sessions liner notes.

Jonathan Allen – recording assistance
Mary J. Blige – vocals, writer
Matt Champlin – editor, engineer
Maddox Chhim – mixing assistance
Isobel Griffiths – assistant contractor
Simon Hale – conductor 
Trehy Harris – recording
Rodney "Darkchild" Jerkins – producer
Jaycen Joshua – mixing
Ryan Kaul – mixing assistance
Everton Nelson – leader
Ben Rhodes – recording assistance
Sam Romans – backing vocals, instruments, producer, writer 
Lucy Whalley – assistant contractor

Charts

References

2014 songs
Songs written by Mary J. Blige
Mary J. Blige songs
Songs with feminist themes
Song recordings produced by Rodney Jerkins
Songs written by Romans (musician)
Gospel songs